Campeón de Campeones is an annual Mexican football competition established in 1942. It started as a Super Cup match between the Liga MX champions and the Copa MX winners. In its current form, since 2003, the winner of the Apertura season faces the winner of the Clausura season, for both Liga MX and Liga MX Femenil, respectively.  The winners of the of Campeón de Campeones qualify for the Campeones Cup, a North American competition, where they face the reigning champion of Major League Soccer.

History

Traditional tournament 
The tournament was established in 1942.  The trophy was presented by the president of Mexico at the time, Manuel Ávila Camacho.  From 1942 until 1995 the tournament was contested between the champion of the Primera and the winner of the Mexican Cup.  Traditionally the single match (with an exception in 1968 and 1988 when two matches were played) to determine the "super cup" winner was held at the end of the season at a stadium in Mexico City.

If a team won both the league championship and the cup that year, they were awarded the title Campeonísimo with an automatic awarding of the trophy.  To date this has only occurred on five occasions (León  in 1949, Cruz Azul in 1969, Guadalajara in 1970, Puebla in 1990, and Necaxa in 1995).

New era 
After 1995 the league championship was split into two shorter seasons Apertura and Clausura. Then in 1997, the Mexican Football Federation canceled the Mexican Cup. Due to these changes, the Campeón de Campeones tournament was postponed. The competition resumed in the 2002-03 season; however, this time it was contested between the champions of Apertura and Clausura of the season. The tournament was held four times and was placed on hiatus again from 2007 to 2011.

In 2012, the rebranded Liga MX restarted the tournament once again with an unofficial match between the champions of Liga MX (first division) and Ascenso MX (second division): Leon won the Cup by beating Santos Laguna 2-0 In the 2013-14 season, the Liga MX stipulated that a Campeón de Campeones match should be contested between the champions of the Apertura 2013 and Copa MX Apertura 2013. The format was changed to a single match at a neutral site, which has been in the United States and shared with the Supercopa MX since 2015.

Since 2018, the winner of the Campeón de Campeones will then compete against the MLS Cup winner in the Campeones Cup.

Similarly to the original traditional tournament, if a team wins both the Apertura and Clausura seasons, the team is automatically awarded the Campeón de Campeones title. This has occurred only once since 2022, when Atlas was awarded the trophy automatically for winning both the 2021 Apertura season and the 2022 Clausura season.

Liga MX Femenil Campeón de Campeones 
On May 24, 2021, the Liga MX Owners Assembly made official the creation of the Campeón de Campeones for Liga MX Femenil.  Tigres Femenil won the first edition automatically by winning the league title of both Guardianes 2020 and Guardianes 2021 tournaments.  Unlike the men's Campeón de Campeones, the women's version is played as a two-legged series.

Supercopa de la Liga MX
Due to Atlas winning both the Apertura 2021 and Clausura 2022, they were automatically awarded the 2022 Campeón de Campeones title. On 9 June 2022, it was announced Atlas would face defending Campeón de Campeones champions Cruz Azul in a new cup called Supercopa de la Liga MX. This cup will happen only when a club is champion of both the Apertura and Clausura seasons in the same Mexican football year (e.g., Atlas).

List of finals

Liga MX

Source: Mexico - List of Super Cup WinnersCampeón de Campeones winner is in bold

Liga MX Femenil 

Source: MilenioCampeón de Campeones winner is in bold

Supercopa de la Liga MX

Performance by club

References

See also
Supercopa MX
Supercopa de la Liga MX
Campeones Cup (Mexico-USA)

External links
 Mexico - List of Super Cup Winners

 
Football competitions in Mexico
Mexico